Dwight Campbell (c. 1888 – June 15, 1964) was a justice of the South Dakota Supreme Court from 1925 to 1937.

Campbell began practicing as an attorney in Aberdeen, South Dakota in 1912, serving as city attorney from 1921 to 1923, and in the South Dakota State Senate for Brown County, South Dakota in 1923. In March 1925, Governor Carl Gunderson appointed Campbell to a seat on the state supreme court vacated by the retirement of ailing justice Frank Anderson; Campbell assumed office on April 1, 1925.

Campbell died at his home in Aberdeen, South Dakota, at the age of 76.

References

1880s births
1964 deaths
South Dakota state senators
People from Aberdeen, South Dakota
Justices of the South Dakota Supreme Court
20th-century American politicians
20th-century American judges